Jason Dockter (born August 31, 1973) is an American politician who has served in the North Dakota House of Representatives from the 7th district since 2012.

References

1973 births
Living people
Politicians from Bismarck, North Dakota
Republican Party members of the North Dakota House of Representatives
21st-century American politicians